Reading (Pennsylvania Dutch: Reddin) is a city in and the county seat of Berks County, Pennsylvania, United States. The city had a population of 95,112 at the 2020 census and is the fourth-largest city in Pennsylvania after Philadelphia, Pittsburgh, and Allentown. Reading is located in the southeastern part of the state and is the principal city of the Greater Reading Area, which had 420,152 residents in 2020. 

Reading is part of the Delaware Valley, also known as the Philadelphia metropolitan area, a region that also includes Philadelphia, Upper Darby, Camden, Atlantic City, Wilmington, and other Philadelphia-area cities and counties. With a 2020 core metropolitan statistical area population of 6.288 million and a combined statistical area population of 7.366 million, the Delaware Valley is the nation's seventh-largest metropolitan region.

Reading gives its name to the now-defunct Reading Company, widely known as the Reading Railroad and since acquired by Conrail, that played a vital role in transporting anthracite coal from the Pennsylvania's Coal Region to major East Coast metropolitan markets through the Port of Philadelphia for much of the 19th and 20th centuries. Reading Railroad is one of the four railroad properties in the classic U.S. version of the Monopoly board game. Reading was one of the first localities where outlet shopping became a tourist industry. It has been known as "The Pretzel City" because numerous local pretzel bakeries are based in the city and its suburbs; currently, Bachman, Dieffenbach, Tom Sturgis, and Unique Pretzel bakeries call the Reading area home. In recent years, the Reading area has become a destination for cyclists with more than 125 miles of trails in five major preserves; the region is an International Mountain Bicycling Association ride center.

According to 2010 U.S. census data, Reading had the highest share of citizens living in poverty in the nation among cities with populations exceeding 65,000. Reading's poverty rate fell over the next decade. Reading's poverty rate in the five-year American Community Survey, published in 2018, showed that 35.4% of the city's residents were below the poverty line, or less "than the infamous 41.3% from 2011, when Reading was declared the poorest small city in the nation."

History

18th century

Lenape people, also known as Delaware Indians, inhabited the Reading area prior to European settlement of the region in the 17th century. The Colony of Pennsylvania was a 1680 land grant from King Charles II of England to William Penn. Comprising more than 45,000 square miles (120,000 km2), it was named for his father, Sir William Penn.

In 1743, Richard and Thomas Penn, both sons of William Penn, mapped out the town of Reading with Conrad Weiser. Taking its name from Reading, Berkshire, England, the town was established in 1748. Upon the creation of Berks County in 1752, Reading became the county seat. The region was settled by emigrants from southern and western Germany, who bought land from the Penns. The first Amish community in the New World was established in Greater Reading, Berks County. The Pennsylvanian German dialect was spoken in the area well into the 1950s.

During the French and Indian War, Reading was a military base for a chain of forts along the Blue Mountain.

By the time of the American Revolution, the area's iron industry had a total production exceeding England's. There were several prominent Ironmasters like Samuel Van Leer who helped supply George Washington's troops with cannons, rifles, and ammunition in the Revolutionary War. During the early period of the conflict, Reading was again a depot for military supply. Hessian prisoners from the Battle of Trenton were also detained here.

Philadelphia was the nation's capital at the time of the 1793 Philadelphia yellow fever epidemic. President George Washington traveled to Reading, and considered making it the emergency national capital, but chose Germantown instead.

19th century

In 1809, Susanna Cox was tried and convicted for infanticide in Reading. Her case attracted tremendous sympathy; 20,000 viewers came to view her hanging, swamping the 3,000 inhabitants.

Census data showed that, from 1810 to 1950, Reading was among the nation's top one hundred largest urban places.

The Schuylkill Canal, a north–south canal completed in 1825, paralleled the Schuylkill River and connected Reading with Philadelphia and the Delaware River. The Union Canal, an east–west canal completed in 1828, connected the Schuylkill and Susquehanna Rivers, and ran from Reading to Middletown, Pennsylvania, a few miles south of Harrisburg, the state capital. Railroads forced the abandonment of the canals by the 1880s.

The naturalist Spencer Fullerton Baird was born in Reading in 1823.

The Philadelphia and Reading Railroad (P&R) was incorporated in 1833. During the Long Depression following the Panic of 1873, a statewide railroad strike in 1877 over delayed wages led to a violent protest and clash with the National Guard in which six Reading men were killed. The Reading Brewing Company was also established around this same time, and was officially chartered in 1886. Following more than a century of prosperity, the Reading Company was forced to file for bankruptcy protection in 1971. The bankruptcy was a result of dwindling coal shipping revenues and strict government regulations that denied railroads the ability to set competitive prices, required high taxes, and forced the railroads to continue to operate money-losing passenger service lines. On April 1, 1976, the Reading Company sold its current railroad interests to the newly formed Consolidated Railroad Corporation (Conrail). That same month, the Reading Brewing Company closed.

The Charles Evans Cemetery is the non-sectarian cemetery where many of the city's prominent business and community leaders have been buried since the cemetery's opening in the 1840s. Established through the donation of land by Reading attorney and philanthropist Charles Evans and a subsequent financial endowment upon his death in 1847, which provided for future improvements to the grounds, the cemetery became a primary gathering point for annual Memorial Day activities from the late 19th through the late 20th centuries due to the presence of the Grand Army of the Republic monument, which was dedicated there in 1887.

20th century
In the early 20th century, the city participated in the burgeoning automobile and motorcycle industry as home to the pioneer "Brass Era" companies, Daniels Motor Company, Duryea Motor Wagon Company, and Reading-Standard Company.

Reading experienced continuous growth until the 1930s, when its population reached nearly 120,000. From the 1940s to the 1970s, however, the city saw a sharp downturn in prosperity, largely owing to the decline of the heavy industry and railroads, on which Reading had been built, and a national trend of urban decline.

In 1972, Hurricane Agnes caused extensive flooding in the city, not the last time the lower precincts of Reading were inundated by the Schuylkill River. A similar, though not as devastating, flood occurred during June 2006.

21st century
In December 2007, NBC's Today show featured Reading as one of the top four "Up and Coming Neighborhoods" in the U.S. as showing potential for a real estate boom. The interviewee, Barbara Corcoran, chose the city by looking for areas of big change, renovations, cleanups of parks, waterfronts, and warehouses. Corcoran also noted Reading's proximity to Philadelphia, New York City, and other cities.

Climate

The climate in and around Reading is variable, but relatively mild compared to areas further north. The Reading area falls under the southern periphery of the hot-summer humid continental climate (Dfa), with areas just to the south designated as a humid subtropical climate zone (Köppen Cfa). Extended periods of heat and high humidity occur. On average, there are 27 days per year where the temperature exceeds . Reading becomes milder in the autumn, as the heat and humidity of summer relent to lower humidity and temperatures. The first killing frost generally occurs in late October.

Winters bring freezing temperatures, but usually move above freezing during the day's warmest point. The all-time record low air temperature (not including wind chill) was  during a widespread cold wave in January 1994. Spring temperatures vary widely between freezing temperatures and the 80s or even 90s (around 30 °C) later in spring. The last killing frost usually is in early to mid April.

January is the only month averaging below freezing while two to three months average above 22 °C (71.6 °F) and seven-months average above .

Geography
The city is largely bounded on the west by the Schuylkill River, on the east by Mount Penn, and on the south by Neversink Mountain. The Reading Prong, the mountain formation stretching northeast into New Jersey, has come to be associated with naturally occurring radon gas; however, homes in Reading are not particularly affected. The surrounding county is home to a number of family-owned farms.

Economy
Companies based in Reading and surrounding communities include Boscov's, EnerSys, Carpenter, GK Elite Sportswear, Penske Truck Leasing, Redner's Markets, and small local developer—Shuman Development Group. Jump Start Incubator, a program of Berks County Community Foundation, and Berks LaunchBox, a project of Penn State Berks, are programs intended to provide office space and support to entrepreneurs in the area.

According to the Greater Reading Chamber of Commerce and Industry, the largest employers in the Berks county area as of 2017 were:

Government and politics
Steve Lutz won five seats on the Reading city council in the 1911 election and their mayoral candidate, Elwood Leffler, almost won causing accusations of election fraud conducted against him. The Republican and Democratic parties united against the Socialists in the 1917 local elections. Reading became the third city in the United States to have a local government controlled by the Socialists after the 1927 election including the election of J. Henry Stump as mayor and James H. Maurer to the city council. After the 1929 election the Socialists gained control over the city council. The Socialists lost support during the Great Depression and were defeated by a united Republican and Democratic ticket in the 1931 election. Stump was defeated by Heber Ermentrout and the party was reduced to two seats on the city council. The Socialists lost their two seats on the city council in the 1933 election.

Infrastructure

Roads and highways

A number of federal and state highways allow entry to and egress from Reading. U.S. Route 422, the major east–west artery, circles the western edge of the city and is known locally as The West Shore Bypass. Various interchanges allow for vehicles on US 422 to enter the City of Reading and vice versa, with the most notable interchange bringing vehicles on and off of the Penn Street Bridge, a historic bridge considered to be the primary gateway to downtown Reading. US 422 leads west to Lebanon and east to Pottstown. U.S. Route 222 bypasses the city to the west, leading southwest to Lancaster and northeast to Allentown. Interstate 176 heads south from US 422 near Reading and leads to the Pennsylvania Turnpike (Interstate 76) in Morgantown. Pennsylvania Route 12 is known as the Warren Street Bypass, as it bypasses downtown Reading to the northwest. PA 12 begins at US 422/US 222 in Wyomissing and heads northeast on the Warren Street Bypass before becoming Pricetown Road and leading northeast to Pricetown. Pennsylvania Route 10 is known as Morgantown Road and heads south from Reading parallel to I-176 to Morgantown. Pennsylvania Route 61 heads north from Reading on Centre Avenue and leads to Pottsville. Pennsylvania Route 183 heads northwest from Reading on Schuylkill Avenue and Bernville Road, leading to Bernville. U.S. Route 222 Business is designated as Lancaster Avenue, Bingaman Street, South 4th Street, and 5th Street through Reading. U.S. Route 422 Business is designated as Penn Street, Washington Street (westbound), Franklin Street (eastbound), and Perkiomen Avenue through Reading.

Public transportation

Public transit in Reading and its surrounding communities has been provided since 1973 by the Berks Area Regional Transportation Authority (BARTA). BARTA operates a fleet of 50 buses (all hybrid electric buses) serving 20 routes, mostly originating at the BARTA Transportation Center in Downtown Reading. BARTA also provides paratransit service in addition to fixed route service. The former Reading Railroad Franklin Street Station was refurbished and reopened to bus service on September 9, 2013, with buses running the express route back and forth to Lebanon Transit. The route to Lebanon was discontinued after a short period, resulting in the refurbished station sitting vacant.

Klein Transportation provides bus service to Reading from a stop in downtown Reading and a stop at the Boscov's at the former Fairgrounds Square Mall to Douglassville, Kutztown, Wescosville, Hellertown, and Midtown Manhattan in New York City. Transport Azumah provides bus service from the InterCity Bus Terminal to New York City. Amtrak Thruway bus service operated by Krapf Coaches runs from the BARTA Transportation Center in Reading to 30th Street Station in Philadelphia, with an intermediate stop in Pottstown.

Reading and the surrounding area is serviced by the Reading Regional Airport, a general aviation airfield. The three-letter airport code for Reading is RDG. Scheduled commercial airline service to Reading ended in 2004, when the last airline, USAir stopped flying into Reading.

Freight rail service in Reading is provided by the Norfolk Southern Railway, the Reading Blue Mountain and Northern Railroad, and the East Penn Railroad. Norfolk Southern Railway serves Reading along the Harrisburg Line, which runs east to Philadelphia and west to Harrisburg, and the Reading Line, which runs northeast to Allentown. Norfolk Southern Railway operates the Reading Yard in Reading. The Reading Blue Mountain and Northern Railroad operates the Reading Division line from an interchange with the Norfolk Southern Railway in Reading north to Port Clinton and Packerton. The East Penn Railroad operates the Lancaster Northern line from Sinking Spring southwest to Ephrata, using trackage rights along Norfolk Southern Railway east from Sinking Spring to an interchange with the Norfolk Southern Railway in Reading.

Passenger trains ran between Pottsville, Reading, Pottstown, and Philadelphia along the Pottsville Line until July 27, 1981, when transit operator SEPTA curtailed commuter service to electrified lines. Since then, there have been repeated calls for the resumption of the services.

In the late 1990s and up to 2003, SEPTA, in cooperation with Reading-based BARTA, funded a study called the Schuylkill Valley Metro which included plans to extend SEPTA's R6 passenger line to Pottstown, Reading, and Wyomissing, Pennsylvania. The project suffered a major setback when it was rejected by the Federal Transit Administration New Starts program, which cited doubts about the ridership projections and financing assumptions used by the study. With the recent surge in gasoline prices and ever-increasing traffic, the planning commissions of Montgomery County and Berks County have teamed to study the feasibility of a simple diesel shuttle train between the Manayunk/Norristown Line and Pottstown/Reading. In 2018, a panel led by the Greater Reading Chamber Alliance pushed for an extension of the Manayunk/Norristown Line to Reading along existing Norfolk Southern freight railroad tracks, with service terminating either at the Franklin Street Station in Reading or in Wyomissing. In 2020, the Pennsylvania Department of Transportation conducted a feasibility study on passenger train service from Reading to Philadelphia. In 2021, Amtrak announced a plan to implement intercity train service from Reading to Philadelphia and New York City, mostly following the Norfolk Southern line between Reading and Philadelphia and the Northeast Corridor between Philadelphia and New York City. In April 2022, the commissions of Berks, Chester, and Montgomery County voted to establish the Schuylkill River Passenger Rail Authority to oversee the restoration of Philadelphia-Reading passenger rail service on the former Reading Railroad right-of-way.

Utilities

Electricity in Reading is provided by Met-Ed, a subsidiary of FirstEnergy. Natural gas service in the city is provided by UGI Utilities. The Reading Area Water Authority provides water to the city, with the city's water supply coming from Lake Ontelaunee and the city's water treated at the Maidencreek Filter Plant. The Reading Water Company was founded in 1821 to supply water to the city. The Reading Area Water Authority was established on May 20, 1994, to take over the water system in the city. Sewer service is provided by the city's Public Works department, with a wastewater treatment plant owned by the city located on Fritz Island. The city's Public Works department provides trash and recycling collection to Reading.

Health care
Hospitals serving the Reading area include Reading Hospital in West Reading and Penn State Health St. Joseph in Bern Township and downtown Reading. Reading Hospital offers an emergency department with a Level I trauma center and various services including Cancer Care, Heart Center, Orthopedic Services, Pediatrics, Primary Care, and Women's Health. Penn State Health St. Joseph offers an emergency department, heart institute, cancer center, stroke center, wound center, orthopedics, and primary care physicians.

Demographics

As of the 2020 United States census, Reading had a population of 95,112. Of which, 68.9% were Hispanic/Latino, 18.9% were non-hispanic White, 8.5% were non-hispanic Black, 0.7% Asian, 0.1% Native American or Pacific Islander, and 2.9% mixed or other.

As of the 2010 census, the city was 48.4% White, 13.2% Black or African American, 0.9% Native American, 1.2% Asian, 0.1% Native Hawaiian, and 6.1% were two or more races. 58.2% of the population were of Hispanic or Latino ancestry.

As of the census of 2000, there were 30,113 households, out of which 33.7% had children under the age of 18 living with them, 34.4% were married couples living together, 20.2% had a female householder with no husband present, and 38.8% were non-families. 31.7% of all households were made up of individuals, and 12.4% had someone living alone who was 65 years of age or older. The average household size was 2.63 and the average family size was 3.33.

In the city, the population was spread out, with 29.9% under the age of 18, 11.7% from 18 to 24, 28.9% from 25 to 44, 17.0% from 45 to 64, and 12.4% who were 65 years of age or older. The median age was 31 years. For every 100 females, there were 93.3 males. For every 100 females age 18 and over, there were 88.5 males.

The median income for a household in the city was $26,698, and the median income for a family was $31,067. Males had a median income of $28,114 versus $21,993 for females. The per capita income for the city was $13,086. 26.1% of the population and 22.3% of families were below the poverty line. 36.5% of those under the age of 18 and 15.6% of those 65 and older were living below the poverty line.

Estimates
As of the American Community Survey 1-Year Estimates, Reading had a population of 80,997. The racial makeup of the city was 48.8% White, 14.0%  African American, 0.2% Native American, 1.4% Asian, 0.0% Pacific Islander, 31.1% from other races, and 4.5% from two or more races.  56.3% were Hispanic or Latino of any race, with 33.5% being of Puerto Rican descent.

According to the US Census Bureau, 32.9% of all residents live below the poverty level, including 45.7% of those under 18. Reading's unemployment rate in May 2010 was 14.7%, while Berks County's unemployment rate was 9.9%.

Neighborhoods

Fire department

The city of Reading is protected by the 135 firefighters and paramedics of the Reading Fire and EMS Department (RFD). The RFD operates out of seven fire stations throughout the city. The RFD operates a fire apparatus fleet of five Engine Companies, three Ladder Companies, one Rescue Company, brush unit, and four front-line Medic Ambulances. In 2018, fire units responded to 9,992 incidents. EMS responses totaled 19,505 calls for service. Department staffing is only two firefighters per apparatus.

Education

The Reading School District provides elementary and middle schools for the city's children. Numerous Catholic parochial schools are also available.

Press reports have indicated that in 2012, about eight percent of Reading's residents have a college degree, compared to a national average of 28%.

Four institutions of higher learning are located in Reading:
 Penn State Berks
 Albright College
 Alvernia University
 Reading Area Community College

Three high schools serve the city:
 Berks Catholic High School (grades 9–12)
 Reading High School (grades 9–12)
 Reading Intermediate High School (grade 8)

Sports

Reading is known for multiple sports franchises, all of which have a long history of success creating professional athletes at the highest levels.

The Reading Fightin Phils, minor league affiliate of the Philadelphia Phillies, who play at FirstEnergy Stadium. Notable alumni are Larry Bowa, Ryne Sandberg, Mike Schmidt, Ryan Howard, and Jimmy Rollins.

Reading United AC, USL League Two affiliate of the Philadelphia Union, are considered one of the top amateur soccer teams in the United States. The team most recently played in the first PDL Championship in team history in 2018. Notable alumni include multiple players with United States men's national soccer team experience, including Matt Hedges, Alex Bono, CJ Sapong, Ben Sweat, and Keegan Rosenberry. Over 110 alumni from the team have gone on to play soccer professionally.

The city has been the residence of numerous professional athletes. Among these native to Reading are Brooklyn Dodgers outfielder Carl Furillo, Baltimore Colts running back Lenny Moore, and Philadelphia 76ers forward Donyell Marshall. Pro golfer Betsy King, a member of the World Golf Hall of Fame, was born in Reading.

The open-wheel racing portion of Penske Racing had been based in Reading, Pennsylvania since 1973 with the cars, during the F1 and CART era, being constructed in Poole, Dorset, England as well as being the base for the F1 team. On October 31, 2005, Penske Racing announced after the 2006 IRL season, they would consolidate IRL and NASCAR operations at the team's Mooresville, North Carolina facility; with the flooding in Pennsylvania in 2006, the team's operations were moved to Mooresville earlier than expected. Penske Truck Leasing is still based in Reading.

Duryea Drive, which ascends Mount Penn in a series of switchbacks, was a testing place for early automobiles and was named for Charles Duryea. The Blue Mountain Region Sports Car Club of America hosts the Duryea Hill Climb, the longest in the Pennsylvania Hillclimb Association series, which follows the same route the automaker used to test his cars.

Reading played host to a stop on the PGA Tour, the Reading Open, in the late 1940s and early 1950s.

Culture

, April 2011
The city's cultural institutions include the Reading Symphony Orchestra and its education project the Reading Symphony Youth Orchestra, the Reading Choral Society, Opus One: Berks Chamber Choir, Berks Sinfonietta Chamber Orchestra, Vox Philia Chamber Choir, the GoggleWorks Art Gallery, the Reading Public Museum and the Historical Society of Berks County.

Reading is the birthplace of graphic artist Jim Steranko, guitar virtuoso Richie Kotzen, novelist and poet John Updike, and poet Wallace Stevens. Marching band composer and writer John Philip Sousa, the March King, died in Reading's Abraham Lincoln Hotel in 1932. Artist Keith Haring was born in Reading.

Reading is home to the 17-time DCA world champion drum and bugle corps, The Reading Buccaneers.

In 1914, one of the anchors of the Battleship Maine was delivered from the Washington Navy Yard to City Park, off of Perkiomen Avenue. The anchor was dedicated during a ceremony presided over by Franklin D. Roosevelt, who was then assistant secretary of the navy.

Reading was home to several movie and theater palaces in the early 20th century. The Astor, Embassy, Loew's Colonial, and Rajah Shrine Theater were grand monuments of architecture and entertainment. Today, after depression, recession, and urban renewal, the Rajah is the only one to remain. The Astor Theater was demolished in 1998 to make way for The Sovereign Center. Certain steps were taken to retain mementos of the Astor, including its ornate Art Deco chandelier and gates. These are on display and in use inside the arena corridors, allowing insight into the ambiance of the former movie house. In 2000, the Rajah was purchased from the Shriners. After a much needed restoration, it was renamed the Sovereign Performing Arts Center. In 2013 the theatre and arena were rebranded as the Santander Performing Arts Center and Santander Arena respectively after Santander Bank purchased Sovereign.

The Mid-Atlantic Air Museum is a membership-supported museum and restoration facility located at Carl A. Spaatz Field. The museum actively displays and restores historic and rare war aircraft and civilian airliners. Most notable to their collection is a Northrop P-61 Black Widow under active restoration since its recovery from Mount Cyclops, New Guinea in 1989. Beginning in 1990, the museum has hosted "World War II Weekend Air Show", scheduled to coincide with D-Day. On display are period wartime aircraft (many of which fly throughout the show) vehicles, and weapons.

The mechanical ice cream scoop was invented in Reading by William Clewell in 1876. The 5th Avenue candy bar and York Peppermint Pattie were invented in Reading.

Sister city
The City of Reading and Reutlingen, Germany are sister cities which participate in student exchanges. Students from Reading High School can apply to become a part of the exchange and travel to Reutlingen for two weeks (mid-September to early October) and in return host German exchange students in the spring. Kutztown University also has a program with Reutlingen.

Reading is twinned with:
  Reutlingen, Baden-Württemberg, Germany, since 1998
 Changzhi, Shanxi, China, since 1992

Attractions

In 1908, a Japanese-style pagoda was built on Mount Penn, where it overlooks the city and is visible from almost everywhere in town. Locally, it is called the "Pagoda". It is currently the home of a café and a gift shop. It remains a popular tourist attraction.

Reading's City Park is home to several monuments and works of public art, including the Frederick Lauer Monument.

Another fixture in Reading's skyline is the William Penn Memorial Fire Tower, one mile from the Pagoda on Skyline Drive. Built in 1939 for fire department and forestry observation, the tower is 120 feet tall, and rises 950 feet above the intersection of fifth and Penn Streets. From the top of the tower is a 60-mile panoramic view.

The Reading Glove and Mitten Manufacturing Company founded in 1899, just outside Reading city limits, in West Reading and Wyomissing boroughs changed its name to Vanity Fair in 1911 and is now the major clothing manufacturer VF Corp. In the early 1970s, the original factories were developed to create the VF Outlet Village, the first outlet mall in the United States. The VF Outlet closed in 2020.

GoggleWorks Center for the Arts is a community art and cultural resource center located in Reading, Pennsylvania. The mission of the GoggleWorks is "to transform lives through unique interactions with art." Located in the former Willson Goggle Factory building, GoggleWorks Center for the Arts features eight teaching studios in ceramics, hot and warm glass, metalsmithing, photography, printmaking, woodworking and virtual reality; 35 juried artist studios; and headquarters of over 40 cultural organizations. GoggleWorks also includes several exhibition galleries, a 130-seat film theatre, a bar/restaurant, and store featuring handcrafted works by over 200 artists working within the building and beyond. Admission and parking are always free. The building was added to the National Register of Historic Places in 2006.

In media
The book and movie Rabbit, Run and the other three novels of the Rabbit series by John Updike were set in fictionalized versions of Reading and nearby Shillington, called Brewer and Olinger respectively. Updike was born in Reading and lived in nearby Shillington until he was thirteen. He also makes reference to the Brewer suburb of Mount Judge, equivalent to Mount Penn, east of Reading.

The play Sweat by Lynn Nottage is set in Reading.

The movie Goon: Last of the Enforcers features Reading as the home of the rival team, the Reading Wolf Dogs.

Notable people

 Gus Alberts (1861–1912), Major League Baseball player
 Coit Albertson (1880–1953), Silent Film actor
 George Warren Alexander (1829–1903), US Army officer and founder of G.W. Alexander & Co., a hat factory 
 Elvin Ayala (b. 1981), professional boxer, World Boxing Council and U.S. National Boxing Council middleweight champion
 John Barrasso (b. 1952), U.S. Senator from Wyoming
Allison Baver (b. 1980), professional speed skater
 Fay Biles (b. 1927), professor emerita of Kent State University
 Albert Boscov (1929–2017), chairman of Boscov's department store
 George Bradley (1852–1931), Major League Baseball player
 Sylvanus C. Breyfogel (1851–1934), bishop of Evangelical Association
 Kenny Brightbill (b. 1948), race car driver
 Peter Brocco (1903–1992), actor
 James Bryant, professional football player
 Harry Buckwalter (1867–1930), photographer, journalist, film director and producer
 James Henry Carpenter (1846–1898), Civil War sailor, officer, founder of Carpenter Technology Corporation
 Ariel Castro, convicted rapist and kidnapper of three women in Cleveland
 Jack Coggins (1911–2006), artist and author
 Kayla Collins (b. 1987), model and Playboy Playmate (August 2008)
 Forrest Compton (1925–2020), actor
 Michael Constantine (1927–2021), actor
 Tullio DeSantis (b. 1948), artist, writer, professor
 Lisa Eichhorn (b. 1952), actress, writer, producer
 Rita Ferrandino (b. 1963), businesswoman
 John Fetterman (b. 1969), Lieutenant Governor of Pennsylvania
 Meg Foster (b. 1948), actress
 Roy Frankhouser (1939–2009), Grand Dragon of the Ku Klux Klan
 Harry Whittier Frees (1879–1953), photographer
 Carl Furillo (1922–1989), Major League Baseball outfielder
 Megan Gallagher (b. 1960), actress
 David McMurtrie Gregg (1833–1916), American Civil War general
 Keith Haring (1958–1990), artist, activist
 Mervin Heller, Jr., past president of the United States Tennis Association
 Corey Hertzog (b. 1990), professional soccer player
 William Muhlenberg Hiester (1818–1878), political and military leader
 Alice Hoover (1928–2014), All-American Girls Professional Baseball League player
 Frank Hovington (1919–1982), blues musician
 Chad Hurley (b. 1977), co-founder and former CEO of YouTube
 Stu Jackson (b. 1955), executive vice president of basketball operations for the NBA
 Mildred Jordan (1901–1982), novelist
 Travis Kauffman (b. 1985), WBF Inter-Continental heavyweight boxing champion and ranked contender
 Ed Kemmer (1921–2004), combat pilot and actor
 Chip Kidd (b. 1964), graphic designer and author
 A.S. King (b. 1970), author, winner of the LA Times Book Prize and a Printz Award honoree
 Betsy King (b.1955), golfer, winner of 34 LPGA Tour events and member of the World Golf Hall of Fame
 Richie Kotzen (b. 1970), rock guitarist
 Rick Krebs (b. 1949), game designer
 Whitey Kurowski (1918–1999), All-Star infielder for the St. Louis Cardinals
 Henry Larkin (1860–1942), Major League Baseball player
 Frederick Lauer (1810–1883), brewer, president of the United States Brewers' Association
 Julian Letterlough (1969–2005), light heavyweight boxing champion
 Steve Little (1965–2000), WBA world middleweight boxing champion
 Donyell Marshall (b. 1973), basketball player, Connecticut and NBA power forward
 Julio Cesar Matthews (b. 1970), Golden Gloves champion and unbeaten professional cruiserweight boxer
 James H. Maurer (1864–1944), Labor leader and two-time Vice Presidential nominee
 Draya Michele (b. 1985), American social media personality, fashion designer, socialite, actress and model
 Morton L. Montgomery (1846–1933), Pennsylvania attorney and historian
 Lenny Moore (b. 1933), NFL running back and Pro Football Hall of Famer
 Stephen Mull, U.S. Assistant Secretary of State for Political Ministry Affairs, U.S. Ambassador to Lithuania
 James Nagle (1822–1866), Civil War general
 Hildegard Peplau (1909–1999), nurse theorist
 Mike Pilot (b. 1975), podcaster
Curtis R. Reitz (b. 1929), Algernon Sydney Biddle Professor of Law at the University of Pennsylvania Law School
 Matthias Richards (1758–1830), U.S. Congressman
 David Robidoux, composer
 Kevin Ross (kickboxer) (b. 1980), former Bellator Kickboxing featherweight champion
 Denise Rutkowski (b. 1962), professional female bodybuilder
 William Sands (1835–1918), U.S. Medal of Honor winner (Civil War)
 Lori and George Schappell (b. 1961), conjoined twins
 John Philip Sousa (1854–1932), iconic composer, died in Reading
 Ray Dennis Steckler (1939–2009), film director
 Jim Steranko (b. 1938), Silver Age comic book artist, magazine publisher and escape artist
 Wallace Stevens (1879–1955), poet
 J. Henry Stump (1880–1949), socialist mayor of Reading 1927–1931, 1935–1939 and 1943–1947
 Taylor Swift (b. 1989), singer-songwriter
 Chuck Thompson (1921–2005), sportscaster
 John Updike (1932–2009), Pulitzer Prize-winning novelist, poet, essayist
 Thomas Usher, CEO of U.S. Steel and chairman of the Board of Marathon Oil
 Samuel Van Leer, (1747–1825) ironmaster and captain in the American Revolutionary War
 Isaac Van Leer, (1772–1821) iron works entrepreneur and owner of several nearby historical homes
 Byron Vazakas (1905–1987), poet
 Charlie Wagner (1912–2006), baseball player for Boston Red Sox
 Lonnie Walker IV, professional basketball basketball player for Los Angeles Lakers
 Angela Washko (b. 1986), artist
 Delores Wells (1937–2016), actress
 Richard "Dick" Wheeler (1922–2008), author and historian
 William Wiswesser (1914-1989), chemist and pioneer in chemical informatics
 Thomas C. Zimmerman (1838–1914), writer, translator of English language classics to Pennsylvania German dialect

References

Further reading
 Reading Eagle archive, Google News Archive, 1868–2000. —PDFs of 38,630 issues.
 Kenneth E. Hendrickson, Jr., The Socialists of Reading, Pennsylvanian and World War I: A Question of Loyalty," Pennsylvania History, vol. 36, no. 4 (October 1969), pp. 430–450. In JSTOR
 Kenneth E. Hendrickson, Jr., "The Socialist Administration in Reading, Pennsylvania, Part I, 1927–1931," Pennsylvania History, vol. 39, no. 4 (October 1972), pp. 417–442. In JSTOR
 Kenneth E. Hendrickson, Jr., "Triumph and Disaster: The Reading Socialists in Power and Decline, Part II, 1932–1939," Pennsylvania History, vol. 40, no. 4 (October 1973), pp. 380–411. In JSTOR
 Henry G. Stetler, The Socialist Movement in Reading, Pennsylvania, 1896–1936. PhD dissertation. Storrs, CT: Henry G. Stetler, 1943.

External links

 
 

 
1743 establishments in Pennsylvania
Cities in Pennsylvania
County seats in Pennsylvania
Cities in Berks County, Pennsylvania
Populated places established in 1743
Populated places on the Schuylkill River